Pseudoclyzomedus ohbayashii is a species of beetle in the family Cerambycidae, and the only species in the genus Pseudoclyzomedus. It was described by Yamasako in 2009.

References

Mesosini
Beetles described in 2009